The South-west European nase (Parachondrostoma toxostoma) is a species of cyprinid fish that is found in France and Spain. Its natural habitats are rivers and water storage areas.

It is threatened by habitat loss.

References 

Parachondrostoma
Freshwater fish of Europe
Fish described in 1837
Taxonomy articles created by Polbot